Kottaiyur  Kodeeswarar Temple(கொட்டையூர் கோடீஸ்வரர் கோயில்) is a Hindu temple dedicated to Lord Shiva, located in Kottaiyur, a village in the outskirts of Kumbakonam, in Thanjavur district in Tamil Nadu, India. Shiva is worshipped as Koteeswarar and His consort Parvathi as Pandhadu Nayaki. Lord Koteeswarar is revered in the 7th century Tamil Saiva canonical and greatest work, Tevaram, written by Tamil saint poets known as the Nayanmars and classified as Paadal Petra Sthalam, the 275 temples revered in the canon.

The temple has a five-tiered Raja Gopuram, the entrance tower and all the shrines are enclosed in rectangular walls. The temple has four daily rituals at various times from 6:00 a.m. to 8 p.m., and three yearly festivals on its calendar, namely Margaḻi Tiruvathirai during the Tamil month of Margaḻi (December–January), Shivaratri in February–March, Panguni Uthiram during Panguni (March–April) and Arrow festival during Purattasi (September–October) being the most prominent. The temple is maintained and administered by the Hindu Religious and Endowment Board of the Government of Tamil Nadu.

Legend

As per Hindu legend, Suruchi, the son of Sathyarthi, the ruler of Trihartha kingdom, took the form of a devil on account of a curse. On account of disfigure, people ran away on seeing him. He prayed to Shiva and was advised to take a holy dip in the spring in the temple. He got his original form and the belief is followed in modern times, where ladies take a holy dip to get a better appearance. As per another legend, sage Herandar (Athreya) is believed to have worshipped Shiva at this place. Pandhadu Nayagi, meaning Goddess playing with a ball, got her name as she is believed to toss the curses of devotees off their suffering. Shiva is believed to have appeared in ten million (called kodi in Tamil) forms of Vinayaga, Parvathi and Muruga and hence got Koteeswarar as his name.

Architecture

The central shrine faces east and houses the image of Kodeeswarar (Shiva) in the form of lingam made of granite. There is a separate shrine for Vinayagar and Murugan on both sides of the entrance to the sanctum. The granite images of Nandi (the bull and vehicle of Shiva), a tall flag staff and a Balipeeta, the place of offering, axial to the sanctum. As in other Shiva temples of Tamil Nadu, the first precinct or the walls around the sanctum of Kodeeswarar has images of Dakshinamurthy (Shiva as the Teacher), Durga (warrior-goddess) and Chandikeswarar (a saint and devotee of Shiva). The temple precinct is surrounded by granite walls. The images of Navagraha, the planetary deities is unique that they are depicted with all their chariots.

Worship and religious practises

The temple priests perform the puja (rituals) during festivals and on a daily basis. The temple rituals are performed four times a day; Kalasanthi at 7:30 a.m., Uchikalam at 11:30 a.m., Sayarakshai at 6:00 p.m and Arthajamam at 8:00 p.m.. Each ritual comprises four steps: abhisheka (sacred bath), alangaram (decoration), naivethanam (food offering) and deepa aradanai (waving of lamps) for Koteeswarar and Pandadu Nayagi. Margaḻi Tiruvathirai during the Tamil month of Margaḻi (December–January), Shivaratri in February–March, Panguni Uthiram during Panguni (March–April) and Arrow festival during Purattasi (September–October) are the four festivals celebrated in the temple.

Religious significance 
The temple is counted as one of the temples built on the northern banks of River Kaveri. It is one of the shrines of the 275 Paadal Petra Sthalams – Shiva Sthalams glorified in the early medieval Tevaram poems by Tamil Saivite Nayanar Tirunavukkarasar. Tirunavukkarasar describes the feature of the deity  of Kottaiyur and Tiruvalanchuzhi as: 

The Mahasamprokshanam also known as Kumbabishegam (consecration) of the temple was held on 26 October 2015.

Specialty 
In all, 12 Shiva temples, including Kottaiyur Kodeeswarar Temple, are connected with Mahamaham festival which happens once in 12 years in Kumbakonam. The remaining 11 temples are as follows:
Kasi Viswanathar Temple
Kumbeswarar Temple
Someswarar Temple
Nageswara Temple
Kalahasteeswarar Temple
Gowthameswarar Temple
Amirthakalasanathar Temple
Banapuriswarar Temple
Abimukeswarar Temple, Kumbakonam
Kambatta Visvanathar Temple
Ekambareswarar Temple

Kumbakonam Sapta Stana Temple
This is one of the Saptha Stana Temples of Kumbakonam. During the Mahahaman of 2016 the palanquin festival was held on 7 February 2016. Following the tirttavari held at Mahamaham tank on 21 April 2016, the palanquin festival of the Sapta Stana Temples were held on 23 April 2016. The festival which started from Kumbesvara Temple at the 7.30 p.m. of 23 April 2016 completed on the morning of 25 April 2016 after going to the following temples.  
 
 Adi Kumbeswarar Temple, Kumbakonam  
 Amirthakadeswarar Temple, Sakkottai  
 Avudainathar Temple, Darasuram 
 Kabartheeswarar Temple 
 Kottaiyur Kodeeswarar Temple 
 Kailasanathar Temple, Melakaveri
 Swaminatha Swamy Temple

References

External links

Photogallery 

Shiva temples in Thanjavur district
Padal Petra Stalam